Dame Veronica Evelyn Sutherland, DBE, CMG (née Beckett; born 25 April 1939) is a former British career diplomat who served in the Diplomatic Service of the United Kingdom from 1965 until 1999, including a stint as Ambassador to the Republic of Ireland. After retirement, she was appointed President of the Lucy Cavendish College, Cambridge from 2001 until 2008.

Background
Born to Lt Col Maurice Beckett and Constance Cavenagh-Mainwaring, Sutherland spent more than thirty years in the Diplomatic Service in mainland Europe, Africa and Asia, serving as Ambassador in three countries in francophone West Africa as well as British delegate to UNESCO. 

After Sutherland's service in Ireland, she was appointed Commonwealth Deputy Secretary-General with responsibility for economic and social affairs. She was the first woman to hold such a high ranking Commonwealth post. She took up her Commonwealth post in February 1999, succeeding Sir Humphrey Maud, KCMG, who was retiring.

References

1939 births
Women academic administrators
British women ambassadors
Commonwealth Deputy Secretaries-General
Companions of the Order of St Michael and St George
Dames Commander of the Order of the British Empire
Living people
Presidents of Lucy Cavendish College, Cambridge
Ambassadors of the United Kingdom to Ireland
Place of birth missing (living people)